Sinocyclocheilus gracilicaudatus is a species of ray-finned fish in the genus Sinocyclocheilus.

References 

gracilicaudatus
Fish described in 2014